7 Network, network seven, a network called 7 or Seven, or variation, may refer to:

 Seven Network, an Australian television broadcast network
 SEVEN Networks, an American networking, mobility, software company
 Network 7 (also Network Seven), a British youth programme on Channel 4
 Seven (UK TV channel) (also Channel 7), independent local UK TV station

See also

 Channel 7 (disambiguation)
 Network (disambiguation)
 7 (disambiguation)
 Seven Regional (disambiguation)
 .NET 7 Microsoft programming framework